"Say It Again"  is the first single of Marie Digby's debut album Unfold. It was released to radio on January 18, 2008, and on iTunes on February 19, 2008. The song was promoted by its appearance on television series Smallville and by the creation of three music videos.

Music videos 

Three music videos have been made for the song.

The first video was filmed by Digby's sisters and a friend. It features her singing and playing the guitar on Venice Beach. The video was first released via Digby's YouTube channel on June 22, 2007, but not made public until Jan 25, 2008.

The second video, released only in some parts of Asia, featured Digby performing the song acoustically in Capitol Studio.

The third and official video premiered on Digby's YouTube channel on May 22, 2008. It shows her in what is presumably a movie studio, with different backdrops and props appearing behind her while she sings, plays her guitar and plays the piano. In the video's description, Digby states:

Track listing

Promo CD single

 "Say It Again" – 3:44

Other version 

 "Say It Again (Acoustic)" – 3:34

Promotion 

"Say It Again" was featured in some episodes of Smallville. The song is the closing theme for season 7, episode 12, "Fracture". In a later episode, it is revealed that the song is the favourite of Kara.

Charts

References 

2008 singles
Marié Digby songs
Hollywood Records singles
Songs written by Jim Dyke
Songs written by Eric Sanicola
2008 songs